The 1906 FA Cup final was contested by Everton and Newcastle United at Crystal Palace. Everton won 1–0, the goal scored by Alex "Sandy" Young.

Match details

Road to the Final

References

Line-ups
Match report at www.fa-cupfinals.co.uk

External links
 Match Report from Everton F.C. website
 Report from www.efchistory.co.uk

1906
FA Cup
Fa Cup Final 1906
Fa Cup Final 1906
FA Cup Final
FA Cup Final